John Doolan may refer to:

 John Doolan (footballer, born 1968), former Wigan Athletic footballer
 John Doolan (footballer, born 1974), former Mansfield Town and Barnet footballer

See also
 Jack Doolan (disambiguation)